Nelson Caeser Crews (1866–1923) was an American public official, newspaper publisher, and community leader in Kansas City, Missouri. Kansas City newspaper The Rising Son lauded him along with other leading figures.

Crews' brother James was the first African American mail carrier in Kansas City.

A park square and tennis courts are named for him.

References

1866 births
1923 deaths
20th-century American newspaper publishers (people)
African-American publishers (people)
Journalists from Missouri
People from Kansas City, Missouri